Cesar Daniel Cáceres Cañete (born 10 June 1977) is a Paraguayan footballer who last played for Club Nacional of the Paraguayan Primera División.

Since he began his career in 1997 he has played most his career in Paraguay where he has played for Sportivo Luqueño, 12 de Octubre, Olimpia, Guaraní and 3 de Febrero. He has also played abroad in Portugal, Chile and Colombia of which those clubs include Campomaiorense, Deportes Antofagasta and Once Caldas.

Honours
 Paraguayan Primera División Torneo Apertura: 2007, 2010
 Paraguayan Primera División Torneo Apertura Top Scorer: 2007
 Paraguayan Primera División Torneo Clausura Top Scorer: 2009

External links
 
 
 

1977 births
Living people
Paraguayan footballers
Paraguayan expatriate footballers
Paraguayan Primera División players
Categoría Primera A players
Sportivo Luqueño players
12 de Octubre Football Club players
Club Olimpia footballers
Club Guaraní players
Once Caldas footballers
C.D. Antofagasta footballers
Club Nacional footballers
Club Atlético 3 de Febrero players
Expatriate footballers in Chile
Expatriate footballers in Colombia
Expatriate footballers in Portugal
Paraguayan expatriate sportspeople in Portugal
Association football midfielders
Sportspeople from Luque
Paraguay international footballers